The Australian Protectionist Party (APP) is a minor Australian far-right anti-immigration party, focused on economic protectionism and white nationalism. and opposes refugees and asylum seekers and often participates in rallies such as the one outside the Villawood Immigration Detention Centre. Since its formation, the party has been active in protesting against the presence of asylum seekers and Muslims, and has also organised several protests against Sharia law being implemented in Australia.

The party was registered as a federal political party with the Australian Electoral Commission on 18 January 2011 and deregistered on 18 June 2015. The party continues to have an active website and seeks donations. Its current officeholders are not disclosed and its address is given as a PO Box in Tasmania.

History
On 10 September 2007, Andrew Phillips, described by the party as its national chairman and South Australian spokesman, formally announced the formation of the Australian Protectionist Party. The formation of the party was described as a split from the Australia First Party.

Darrin Hodges ran unsuccessfully as a candidate in the 2008 elections for Sutherland Shire Council, coming last in his ward. At the 2010 Australian federal election, Hodges and Nicholas Hunter-Folkes (aka. Nick Folkes) ran a Senate ticket in New South Wales, running as independents, as APP was not registered in time. They received 1,864 votes or 0.04% of the vote. Andrew Phillips stood for the seat of Mayo in South Australia, also as an independent, receiving 993 votes or 1.08% of the votes.

APP was registered as a federal political party with the Australian Electoral Commission on 18 January 2011.

In June 2012, Andrew Phillips was described as the party's nominal leader, following the resignation of de facto party leader Darrin Hodges. In September 2012, NSW chairman Nick Folkes unsuccessfully contested the NSW council elections for the Municipality of Leichhardt, receiving 41 votes or 0.6% of the total vote for the ward. In December 2012, Folkes resigned from APP to form Party for Freedom, modeled on Wilder's Freedom Party, and taking the entire Sydney branch with him. Folkes' Party for Freedom appears to have links to Pauline Hanson's One Nation.

At the 2013 Australian federal election for the Senate in NSW, the APP ticket of Mark Grech and Christian Johns received 2,424 votes or 0.06% of the vote. The AEC deregistered APP on 18 June 2015.

In June 2016, APP in Western Australia hosted a public speaking event in Perth featuring Graeme Campbell, whom APP described as "the Father of modern Australian nationalism". Campbell was the founder in 1996 of the far-right Australia First Party and had at times been a Labor, One Nation and independent MP.

In October 2016, the Australian Protectionist Party joined with the Australia First Party, Nationalist Alternative, Eureka Youth League, and Hellenic Nationalists of Australia to form the Australian Coalition of Nationalists (ACN).

The APP hailed the election of US president Donald Trump, believing this "ushered in a new era".

Federal parliament

See also 
 Protectionist Party

References

External links
 Australian Protectionist Party website

Australian nationalist parties
Right-wing populism
Anti-Islam sentiment in Australia
Anti-immigration politics in Australia
Protectionism
Australian nationalism
Far-right political parties in Australia
Organisations based in Victoria (Australia)
White nationalism in Australia
Social conservative parties